Brevoxathres irrorata is a species of longhorn beetles of the subfamily Lamiinae. It was described by Monne in 2007, and is known from Brazil.

References

Beetles described in 2007
Acanthocinini